Altrei  is a comune (municipality) in South Tyrol in northern Italy.

Geography
The surrounding communities of Capriana, Carano, Castello-Molina di Fiemme, and Valfloriana in the north, south and east all belong to the Trentino province, except for Truden in the northwest. In the southeast, the Altrei municipal area stretches down to the Avisio valley. Large parts belong to the Trudner Horn Nature Park.

Frazioni
The municipality of Altrei contains the frazioni (subdivisions, mainly villages and hamlets) Eben (Pramarino) and Guggal.

Linguistic distribution
According to the 2011 census, 87.80% of the population speak German, 12.20% Italian as first language.

Demographic evolution

History

Antereu was first mentioned in a 1321 deed issued by Count Henry of Gorizia-Tyrol, who had the area settled by German peasants. It was part of Henry's successful attempts to encounter the feudal sovereignty of the prince-bishops of Trent in the Fiemme Valley. The remote area remained a Tyrolean possession until in 1779 the Habsburg empress Maria Theresa exchanged it for nearby Tramin in the Etschtal. After the 1803 secularisation, all Fiemme Valley estates were incorporated into the Austrian crown land of Tyrol.

During the Fascist regime, Altrei from 1926 was part of the larger Capriana municipality within the Trentino province; it was again affiliated with South Tyrol according to the First Autonomy Statute of 1948.

Coat-of-arms
The emblem represents the ten farms built in 1321 that formed the core of Altrei. The shield is party per fess countchanged, each part is divided into five vertical, the colors are sable and argent alternate. The emblem was adopted in 1968.

References

External links

Municipal website 

Municipalities of South Tyrol
Articles which contain graphical timelines